Bill Garner may refer to:

Bill Garner (footballer) (born 1947), English football player
Bill Garner (basketball) (born 1940), American basketball player

See also
William Garner (disambiguation)